John Middleton "Jack" Vining (December 23, 1758February 1802) was an American lawyer and politician from Dover, in Kent County, Delaware. He was a Continental Congressman from Delaware, and a member of the Federalist Party, who served in the Delaware General Assembly and as United States Representative and United States Senator from Delaware.

Early life and family
Vining was born in Dover in the Delaware Colony, son of John and Phoebe Wynkoop Vining. His father was a prominent and successful lawyer and landholder, who had been a Speaker of the Colonial Assembly and Chief Justice of Delaware. He was also the good friend of Caesar Rodney, who stood as godfather for his son John, the subject of this article. Vining's father died when his son was eleven years old, and from him John and his sister inherited a large fortune. On November 29, 1790, while he was a U.S. Representative in New York City, he married Anna Maria Seton, a poet, musician, and daughter of William Seton of New York. She fit well into Vining's social circle, and they had four sons, John, William, Benjamin, and Charles, but she died prematurely in 1800.

Political career

Vining studied law under George Read in New Castle, Delaware, and was admitted to the Delaware Bar in 1782, starting a practice in Dover. Because of his family's wealth and prominence he was elected three times to represent Delaware in the Continental Congress. First elected April 8, 1784, he served until October 27, 1786, although, like many of his contemporaries, his attendance was irregular. He was then elected to the 1787/88 and 1788/89 sessions of the Delaware House of Assembly.

In a special election on January 7, 1789, Vining defeated four other candidates to win election as the only member from Delaware to the 1st U.S. House of Representatives. Two years later he was re-elected to a second term. Although he arrived weeks late for every session, he was an energetic and conscientious legislator, consistently voting in support of the administration, particularly favoring a strong executive. He served on thirty-eight committees in the 1st U.S. House, including the committee considering the first proposed amendments to the Constitution, and the joint committee on rules.

Vining's positions were generally loose-constructionist, or Hamiltonian. Accordingly, he strongly favored the federal assumption of the state's revolutionary war debts. In the debate over the location of a national capital, he sought consideration for Wilmington, Delaware, but once that lost, supported an immediate move to Philadelphia, and the later construction of a city on the Potomac River.

In 1793 he returned to Dover, Delaware as a State Senator, but was soon elected to the U.S. Senate. He served there for five years, from March 4, 1793 until his resignation on January 19, 1798, and subsequent retirement from public life.

Death and legacy
Vining died in Dover and is buried in an unmarked grave in the Christ Episcopal Church Cemetery at Dover.

Vining was a handsome, friendly, and outspoken member of a prominent and wealthy family. He was described as a "colorful," speaker who "brandished a florid metaphor," but also as "verbose" and "not above resorting to inflammatory language." His sister, Mary, who was a frequent companion of Anthony Wayne, lived with Vining, and together they entertained frequently and lavishly. Because of this hospitality and generosity he was known as "the pet of Delaware." But he spent through his fortune and suffering from alcoholism, and the death of his wife, went through a rapid decline on the way to an impoverished and premature death. His sister dedicated herself to raising Vining's four sons, but they died young as well, within a year of her death in 1821.

Elizabeth Montgomery in her Reminiscences in Wilmington wrote: "His brilliant talents, not nourished by application, withered in the bud. Indolence and generosity engendered extravagance that wasted his substance."

Almanac
Elections were held October 1. Members of the General Assembly took office on October 20 or the following weekday. The State Councilmen were elected for a three-year term and the State Assemblymen for a one-year term. They chose the Continental Congressmen for a one-year term. U.S. Representatives took office March 4 and have a two-year term. The General Assembly chose the U.S. Senators, who took office March 4 for a six-year term.

After 1792 elections were moved to the first Tuesday of October and members of the General Assembly took office on the first Tuesday of January. The Legislative Council was renamed the State Senate and the House of Assembly was renamed the State House of Representatives.

Vining family
Captain Benjamin Vining (1685–1735), port collector in Salem and Marblehead, Massachusetts
Married first, Ann
Married second, Mary Middleton. She married secondly Nicholas Greenberry Ridgely (1674–1755), and were parents of Dr. Charles Greenberry Ridgely
John Vining (1724–1770), married Phoebe Wynkoop 
Mary "Polly" Vining (1756–1821)
John Middleton Vining (1758–1802), married Anna Maria Seton
John Vining (1791–1817), U.S. Navy
William Henry Vining (1794–1822), lawyer
Benjamin Vining (c. 1796–1822) U.S. Army
Charles Ridgely Vining (1798–1821)
Mary "Polly" Vining (born c. 1730), married the Rev. Charles Inglis
Benjamin Vining (c. 1730–1785)

Notes

References

Images
 Portrait courtesy of the Delaware Public Archives.
Biographical Directory of the United States Congress

External links
Biographical Directory of the United States Congress
Delaware's Members of Congress

The Political Graveyard
Delaware Historical Society; website; 505 North Market Street, Wilmington, Delaware 19801; (302) 655-7161
University of Delaware; Library website; 181 South College Avenue, Newark, Delaware 19717; (302) 831–2965

1758 births
1802 deaths
People from Dover, Delaware
People of colonial Delaware
Continental Congressmen from Delaware
Pro-Administration Party members of the United States House of Representatives from Delaware
Pro-Administration Party United States senators from Delaware
Federalist Party United States senators from Delaware
Members of the Delaware House of Representatives
Delaware state senators
19th-century American politicians
Delaware lawyers
Burials in Dover, Delaware
19th-century American Episcopalians
Members of the United States House of Representatives from Delaware